Dominique Yvon (born 5 July 1968) is a French former ice dancer. With Frédéric Palluel, she is a two-time French national champion (1989, 1992). They finished 8th at the 1992 Winter Olympics and 7th at the 1992 World Championships.

Results 
With Palluel:

References

1968 births
Living people
French female ice dancers
Olympic figure skaters of France
Figure skaters at the 1992 Winter Olympics
Sportspeople from Versailles, Yvelines
20th-century French women